The 2001–02 Ottawa Senators season was the tenth season of the Ottawa Senators of the National Hockey League (NHL). This season saw the Senators place third in the Northeast Division, with 94 points. In the playoffs, they upset the Philadelphia Flyers in five games, limiting the Flyers' high-powered offence to just two goals for the franchise's second playoff series win. This led to a second round series with the Toronto Maple Leafs, in which the Sens lost in a tense seven-game affair.

Off-season
Prior to the season, former captain Alexei Yashin was traded to the New York Islanders for Zdeno Chara, Bill Muckalt and the Islanders' first-round draft pick (second overall), which the Sens used to draft Jason Spezza. Chara and Muckalt would play for the Senators, while Spezza returned to junior.

Regular season
On November 13, 2001, the Senators defeated the Washington Capitals on the road by a score of 11–5. Captain Daniel Alfredsson scored a hat-trick in the game. It was the first time that an NHL team had scored ten goals in a regular-season game since February 3, 1999, when the Washington Capitals defeated the Tampa Bay Lightning at home by a score of 10–1. It was also the first time in modern franchise history that the Senators had scored ten goals in a regular-season game.

Final standings

Playoffs
In the first round, Ottawa was matched against the Philadelphia Flyers, who were favoured. After the Flyers won the first game, the Senators won the next four. Patrick Lalime would record three consecutive shutouts in games two through four. The Senators won the series by winning the fifth game in overtime, in Philadelphia.

The Senators would go against the Toronto Maple Leafs for the third consecutive season in the playoffs. The teams would take turns winning games and the series would go seven games, with the deciding game won in Toronto by the Maple Leafs.

Schedule and results

Regular season

|- align="center" bgcolor="#CCFFCC"
|1||W||October 3, 2001||5–4 || align="left"| @ Toronto Maple Leafs (2001–02) ||1–0–0–0||19,173 || 
|- align="center" bgcolor="#FFBBBB"
|2||L||October 4, 2001||4–6 || align="left"|  Montreal Canadiens (2001–02) ||1–1–0–0||18,500 || 
|- align="center" bgcolor="#FFBBBB"
|3||L||October 6, 2001||2–3 || align="left"| @ Buffalo Sabres (2001–02) ||1–2–0–0||16,590 || 
|- align="center" bgcolor="#CCFFCC"
|4||W||October 9, 2001||6–2 || align="left"| @ Carolina Hurricanes (2001–02) ||2–2–0–0||10,052 || 
|- align="center" bgcolor="#CCFFCC"
|5||W||October 10, 2001||2–0 || align="left"| @ Florida Panthers (2001–02) ||3–2–0–0||14,651 || 
|- align="center"
|6||T||October 13, 2001||2–2 OT|| align="left"|  New York Rangers (2001–02) ||3–2–1–0||17,103 || 
|- align="center" bgcolor="#FFBBBB"
|7||L||October 16, 2001||2–5 || align="left"| @ Pittsburgh Penguins (2001–02) ||3–3–1–0||14,907 || 
|- align="center" bgcolor="#FFBBBB"
|8||L||October 18, 2001||0–3 || align="left"|  Pittsburgh Penguins (2001–02) ||3–4–1–0||15,521 || 
|- align="center" bgcolor="#FFBBBB"
|9||L||October 20, 2001||2–3 || align="left"| @ New Jersey Devils (2001–02) ||3–5–1–0||15,124 || 
|- align="center" bgcolor="#FFBBBB"
|10||L||October 23, 2001||1–2 || align="left"|  New Jersey Devils (2001–02) ||3–6–1–0||15,107 || 
|- align="center" bgcolor="#CCFFCC"
|11||W||October 25, 2001||7–2 || align="left"| @ Philadelphia Flyers (2001–02) ||4–6–1–0||19,534 || 
|- align="center" bgcolor="#CCFFCC"
|12||W||October 27, 2001||4–1 || align="left"|  St. Louis Blues (2001–02) ||5–6–1–0||16,119 || 
|- align="center" bgcolor="#CCFFCC"
|13||W||October 30, 2001||6–3 || align="left"| @ Atlanta Thrashers (2001–02) ||6–6–1–0||11,548 || 
|-

|- align="center" bgcolor="#CCFFCC"
|14||W||November 3, 2001||3–0 || align="left"|  Buffalo Sabres (2001–02) ||7–6–1–0||15,942 || 
|- align="center" bgcolor="#CCFFCC"
|15||W||November 8, 2001||1–0 || align="left"|  Colorado Avalanche (2001–02) ||8–6–1–0||17,752 || 
|- align="center" bgcolor="#CCFFCC"
|16||W||November 10, 2001||3–2 || align="left"|  Nashville Predators (2001–02) ||9–6–1–0||16,895 || 
|- align="center" bgcolor="#CCFFCC"
|17||W||November 13, 2001||11–5 || align="left"| @ Washington Capitals (2001–02) ||10–6–1–0||15,023 || 
|- align="center"
|18||T||November 15, 2001||1–1 OT|| align="left"|  Carolina Hurricanes (2001–02) ||10–6–2–0||14,117 || 
|- align="center" bgcolor="#CCFFCC"
|19||W||November 17, 2001||2–1 OT|| align="left"|  Toronto Maple Leafs (2001–02) ||11–6–2–0||18,500 || 
|- align="center" bgcolor="#CCFFCC"
|20||W||November 20, 2001||3–0 || align="left"|  Vancouver Canucks (2001–02) ||12–6–2–0||15,547 || 
|- align="center"
|21||T||November 22, 2001||4–4 OT|| align="left"|  Calgary Flames (2001–02) ||12–6–3–0||16,839 || 
|- align="center" bgcolor="#FFBBBB"
|22||L||November 24, 2001||3–6 || align="left"|  Atlanta Thrashers (2001–02) ||12–7–3–0||15,839 || 
|- align="center" bgcolor="#FFBBBB"
|23||L||November 27, 2001||2–4 || align="left"| @ St. Louis Blues (2001–02) ||12–8–3–0||19,786 || 
|-

|- align="center" bgcolor="#CCFFCC"
|24||W||December 1, 2001||2–1 OT|| align="left"|  Boston Bruins (2001–02) ||13–8–3–0||16,480 || 
|- align="center" bgcolor="#FFBBBB"
|25||L||December 3, 2001||2–4 || align="left"| @ Colorado Avalanche (2001–02) ||13–9–3–0||18,007 || 
|- align="center" bgcolor="#CCFFCC"
|26||W||December 5, 2001||6–3 || align="left"| @ Dallas Stars (2001–02) ||14–9–3–0||18,532 || 
|- align="center" bgcolor="#FFBBBB"
|27||L||December 6, 2001||2–4 || align="left"| @ Nashville Predators (2001–02) ||14–10–3–0||12,522 || 
|- align="center" bgcolor="#CCFFCC"
|28||W||December 8, 2001||5–2 || align="left"|  Tampa Bay Lightning (2001–02) ||15–10–3–0||15,277 || 
|- align="center"
|29||T||December 11, 2001||2–2 OT|| align="left"| @ New York Islanders (2001–02) ||15–10–4–0||12,235 || 
|- align="center" bgcolor="#CCFFCC"
|30||W||December 13, 2001||6–0 || align="left"|  Phoenix Coyotes (2001–02) ||16–10–4–0||17,585 || 
|- align="center" bgcolor="#FFBBBB"
|31||L||December 15, 2001||0–2 || align="left"|  New Jersey Devils (2001–02) ||16–11–4–0||17,142 || 
|- align="center" bgcolor="#CCFFCC"
|32||W||December 18, 2001||5–1 || align="left"| @ Carolina Hurricanes (2001–02) ||17–11–4–0||11,166 || 
|- align="center" bgcolor="#FFBBBB"
|33||L||December 20, 2001||2–4 || align="left"|  Los Angeles Kings (2001–02) ||17–12–4–0||16,207 || 
|- align="center" bgcolor="#CCFFCC"
|34||W||December 22, 2001||1–0 || align="left"| @ New Jersey Devils (2001–02) ||18–12–4–0||15,089 || 
|- align="center" bgcolor="#FFBBBB"
|35||L||December 23, 2001||2–3 || align="left"| @ New York Rangers (2001–02) ||18–13–4–0||18,200 || 
|- align="center" bgcolor="#FFBBBB"
|36||L||December 26, 2001||2–3 || align="left"| @ Boston Bruins (2001–02) ||18–14–4–0||17,565 || 
|- align="center" bgcolor="#CCFFCC"
|37||W||December 27, 2001||5–2 || align="left"|  New York Islanders (2001–02) ||19–14–4–0||18,500 || 
|- align="center" bgcolor="#CCFFCC"
|38||W||December 29, 2001||5–2 || align="left"| @ Pittsburgh Penguins (2001–02) ||20–14–4–0||17,148 || 
|- align="center" bgcolor="#FF6F6F"
|39||OTL||December 31, 2001||4–5 OT|| align="left"|  Chicago Blackhawks (2001–02) ||20–14–4–1||17,622 || 
|-

|- align="center" bgcolor="#CCFFCC"
|40||W||January 3, 2002||4–1 || align="left"|  Washington Capitals (2001–02) ||21–14–4–1||18,296 || 
|- align="center" bgcolor="#FFBBBB"
|41||L||January 5, 2002||1–3 || align="left"| @ Toronto Maple Leafs (2001–02) ||21–15–4–1||19,235 || 
|- align="center" bgcolor="#CCFFCC"
|42||W||January 7, 2002||4–3 || align="left"|  Toronto Maple Leafs (2001–02) ||22–15–4–1||18,500 || 
|- align="center" bgcolor="#FF6F6F"
|43||OTL||January 9, 2002||3–4 OT|| align="left"| @ Atlanta Thrashers (2001–02) ||22–15–4–2||10,721 || 
|- align="center" bgcolor="#CCFFCC"
|44||W||January 11, 2002||4–2 || align="left"| @ Florida Panthers (2001–02) ||23–15–4–2||14,105 || 
|- align="center" bgcolor="#CCFFCC"
|45||W||January 12, 2002||2–1 || align="left"| @ Tampa Bay Lightning (2001–02) ||24–15–4–2||13,712 || 
|- align="center" bgcolor="#FFBBBB"
|46||L||January 15, 2002||1–4 || align="left"|  Philadelphia Flyers (2001–02) ||24–16–4–2||16,246 || 
|- align="center" bgcolor="#FFBBBB"
|47||L||January 17, 2002||2–5 || align="left"| @ Boston Bruins (2001–02) ||24–17–4–2||15,989 || 
|- align="center" bgcolor="#CCFFCC"
|48||W||January 19, 2002||4–1 || align="left"|  Minnesota Wild (2001–02) ||25–17–4–2||17,398 || 
|- align="center" bgcolor="#FF6F6F"
|49||OTL||January 20, 2002||2–3 OT|| align="left"| @ Detroit Red Wings (2001–02) ||25–17–4–3||20,058 || 
|- align="center"
|50||T||January 22, 2002||1–1 OT|| align="left"| @ Philadelphia Flyers (2001–02) ||25–17–5–3||19,469 || 
|- align="center" bgcolor="#CCFFCC"
|51||W||January 24, 2002||4–3 || align="left"|  Boston Bruins (2001–02) ||26–17–5–3||17,093 || 
|- align="center"
|52||T||January 26, 2002||1–1 OT|| align="left"| @ Montreal Canadiens (2001–02) ||26–17–6–3||21,273 || 
|- align="center" bgcolor="#CCFFCC"
|53||W||January 30, 2002||3–1 || align="left"|  Philadelphia Flyers (2001–02) ||27–17–6–3||15,761 || 
|-

|- align="center"
|54||T||February 4, 2002||4–4 OT|| align="left"| @ Tampa Bay Lightning (2001–02) ||27–17–7–3||12,358 || 
|- align="center" bgcolor="#CCFFCC"
|55||W||February 6, 2002||6–4 || align="left"| @ Columbus Blue Jackets (2001–02) ||28–17–7–3||18,136 || 
|- align="center" bgcolor="#FF6F6F"
|56||OTL||February 8, 2002||2–3 OT|| align="left"| @ Buffalo Sabres (2001–02) ||28–17–7–4||18,104 || 
|- align="center" bgcolor="#FFBBBB"
|57||L||February 9, 2002||2–3 || align="left"|  Detroit Red Wings (2001–02) ||28–18–7–4||18,500 || 
|- align="center" bgcolor="#CCFFCC"
|58||W||February 12, 2002||5–1 || align="left"|  Pittsburgh Penguins (2001–02) ||29–18–7–4||17,332 || 
|- align="center" bgcolor="#CCFFCC"
|59||W||February 26, 2002||5–2 || align="left"| @ Montreal Canadiens (2001–02) ||30–18–7–4||20,254 || 
|- align="center" bgcolor="#CCFFCC"
|60||W||February 28, 2002||3–0 || align="left"| @ New York Rangers (2001–02) ||31–18–7–4||18,200 || 
|-

|- align="center" bgcolor="#FF6F6F"
|61||OTL||March 2, 2002||2–3 OT|| align="left"|  Washington Capitals (2001–02) ||31–18–7–5||17,814 || 
|- align="center"
|62||T||March 4, 2002||1–1 OT|| align="left"| @ Los Angeles Kings (2001–02) ||31–18–8–5||15,815 || 
|- align="center" bgcolor="#FFBBBB"
|63||L||March 7, 2002||2–5 || align="left"| @ San Jose Sharks (2001–02) ||31–19–8–5||17,496 || 
|- align="center" bgcolor="#FFBBBB"
|64||L||March 9, 2002||2–3 || align="left"| @ Phoenix Coyotes (2001–02) ||31–20–8–5||15,381 || 
|- align="center" bgcolor="#CCFFCC"
|65||W||March 10, 2002||4–2 || align="left"| @ Mighty Ducks of Anaheim (2001–02) ||32–20–8–5||12,358 || 
|- align="center" bgcolor="#CCFFCC"
|66||W||March 12, 2002||4–3 OT|| align="left"| @ Minnesota Wild (2001–02) ||33–20–8–5||18,064 || 
|- align="center" bgcolor="#FFBBBB"
|67||L||March 14, 2002||1–4 || align="left"|  Edmonton Oilers (2001–02) ||33–21–8–5||18,397 || 
|- align="center" bgcolor="#CCFFCC"
|68||W||March 16, 2002||4–3 || align="left"|  New York Islanders (2001–02) ||34–21–8–5||18,137 || 
|- align="center" bgcolor="#CCFFCC"
|69||W||March 17, 2002||2–0 || align="left"|  Florida Panthers (2001–02) ||35–21–8–5||16,405 || 
|- align="center" bgcolor="#FFBBBB"
|70||L||March 19, 2002||1–5 || align="left"| @ Buffalo Sabres (2001–02) ||35–22–8–5||13,381 || 
|- align="center" bgcolor="#FFBBBB"
|71||L||March 21, 2002||2–5 || align="left"|  New York Rangers (2001–02) ||35–23–8–5||16,245 || 
|- align="center" bgcolor="#FF6F6F"
|72||OTL||March 23, 2002||2–3 OT|| align="left"|  Atlanta Thrashers (2001–02) ||35–23–8–6||16,061 || 
|- align="center" bgcolor="#FF6F6F"
|73||OTL||March 24, 2002||2–3 OT|| align="left"|  Buffalo Sabres (2001–02) ||35–23–8–7||17,098 || 
|- align="center" bgcolor="#CCFFCC"
|74||W||March 27, 2002||4–1 || align="left"| @ New York Islanders (2001–02) ||36–23–8–7||13,384 || 
|- align="center" bgcolor="#FFBBBB"
|75||L||March 28, 2002||3–4 || align="left"|  Florida Panthers (2001–02) ||36–24–8–7||14,352 || 
|- align="center" bgcolor="#CCFFCC"
|76||W||March 30, 2002||3–1 || align="left"|  Tampa Bay Lightning (2001–02) ||37–24–8–7||17,859 || 
|-

|- align="center" bgcolor="#CCFFCC"
|77||W||April 2, 2002||4–3 || align="left"|  Carolina Hurricanes (2001–02) ||38–24–8–7||16,371 || 
|- align="center"
|78||T||April 5, 2002||0–0 OT|| align="left"| @ Washington Capitals (2001–02) ||38–24–9–7||18,672 || 
|- align="center" bgcolor="#FFBBBB"
|79||L||April 7, 2002||1–3 || align="left"|  Montreal Canadiens (2001–02) ||38–25–9–7||17,994 || 
|- align="center" bgcolor="#FFBBBB"
|80||L||April 9, 2002||3–4 || align="left"| @ Montreal Canadiens (2001–02) ||38–26–9–7||21,273 || 
|- align="center" bgcolor="#CCFFCC"
|81||W||April 11, 2002||4–0 || align="left"|  Boston Bruins (2001–02) ||39–26–9–7||16,731 || 
|- align="center" bgcolor="#FFBBBB"
|82||L||April 13, 2002||2–5 || align="left"|  Toronto Maple Leafs (2001–02) ||39–27–9–7||18,500 || 
|-

|-
| Legend:

Playoffs

|- align="center" bgcolor="#FFBBBB"
| 1 ||L|| April 17, 2002 || 0–1 OT || align="left"| @ Philadelphia Flyers || Flyers lead 1–0 || 19,420 || 
|- align="center" bgcolor="#CCFFCC"
| 2 ||W|| April 20, 2002 || 3–0 || align="left"| @ Philadelphia Flyers || Series tied 1–1 || 19,734 || 
|- align="center" bgcolor="#CCFFCC"
| 3 ||W|| April 22, 2002 || 3–0 || align="left"| Philadelphia Flyers || Senators lead 2–1 || 18,239 || 
|- align="center" bgcolor="#CCFFCC"
| 4 ||W|| April 24, 2002 || 3–0 || align="left"| Philadelphia Flyers || Senators lead 3–1 || 18,500 || 
|- align="center" bgcolor="#CCFFCC"
| 5 ||W|| April 26, 2002 || 2–1 OT || align="left"| @ Philadelphia Flyers || Senators win 4–1 || 19,639 || 
|-

|- align="center" bgcolor="#CCFFCC"
| 1 ||W|| May 2, 2002 || 5–0 || align="left"| @ Toronto Maple Leafs || Senators lead 1–0 || 19,406 || 
|- align="center" bgcolor="#FFBBBB"
| 2 ||L|| May 4, 2002 || 2–3 3OT || align="left"| @ Toronto Maple Leafs || Series tied 1–1 || 19,454 || 
|- align="center" bgcolor="#CCFFCC"
| 3 ||W|| May 6, 2002 || 3–2 || align="left"| Toronto Maple Leafs || Senators lead 2–1 || 18,500 || 
|- align="center" bgcolor="#FFBBBB"
| 4 ||L|| May 8, 2002 || 1–2 || align="left"| Toronto Maple Leafs || Series tied 2–2 || 18,500 || 
|- align="center" bgcolor="#CCFFCC"
| 5 ||W|| May 10, 2002 || 4–2 || align="left"| @ Toronto Maple Leafs || Senators lead 3–2 || 19,499 || 
|- align="center" bgcolor="#FFBBBB"
| 6 ||L|| May 12, 2002 || 3–4 || align="left"| Toronto Maple Leafs || Series tied 3–3 || 18,500 || 
|- align="center" bgcolor="#FFBBBB"
| 7 ||L|| May 14, 2002 || 0–3 || align="left"| @ Toronto Maple Leafs || Maple Leafs win 4–3 || 19,551 || 
|-

|-
| Legend:

Player statistics

Scoring
 Position abbreviations: C = Centre; D = Defence; G = Goaltender; LW = Left Wing; RW = Right Wing
  = Joined team via a transaction (e.g., trade, waivers, signing) during the season. Stats reflect time with the Senators only.
  = Left team via a transaction (e.g., trade, waivers, release) during the season. Stats reflect time with the Senators only.

Goaltending

Awards and records
 Molson Cup - Daniel Alfredsson

Transactions
The Senators were involved in the following transactions from June 10, 2001, the day after the deciding game of the 2001 Stanley Cup Finals, through June 13, 2002, the day of the deciding game of the 2002 Stanley Cup Finals.

Trades

Players acquired

Players lost

Signings

Draft picks

Ottawa's draft picks from the 2001 NHL Entry Draft held on June 23 and 24, 2001, at the National Car Rental Center in Sunrise, Florida.

Farm teams
 Grand Rapids Griffins (American Hockey League)
 Mobile Mysticks (East Coast Hockey League)

See also
 2001–02 NHL season

Notes

References

Ottawa Senators seasons
Ottawa Senators season
Ottawa